National Convention (CN) was a political party in the Central African Republic led by David Galiambo.

History
The party was established in October 1991. In the 1993 general elections it won three seats in the National Assembly.

The party did not win a seat in the 1998 parliamentary elections, but held a ministerial post in the governments of Anicet-Georges Dologuélé and Martin Ziguélé between 1999 and 2003.

References

1991 establishments in the Central African Republic
Defunct political parties in the Central African Republic
Political parties established in 1991
Political parties with year of disestablishment missing